Angeliki Exarchou (born August 19, 1985) is a Greek former swimmer, who specialized in breaststroke events. She represented her nation Greece at the 2008 Summer Olympics, and had also collected a total of four medals (one silver and three bronze) in an international competition, spanning two editions of the Mediterranean Games (2005 and 2009). Exarchou also dipped under a 1:10 barrier to set a Greek record of 1:08.99 in the 100 m breaststroke at the 2009 Mediterranean Games in Pescara, Italy.

Exarchou competed as part of the Greek squad in a breaststroke double at the 2008 Summer Olympics in Beijing. Leading up to the Games, she cleared FINA B-standard entry times of 1:09.35 (100 m breaststroke) and 2:30.05 (200 m breaststroke) at the 2007 Summer Universiade in Bangkok, Thailand. In the 100 m breaststroke, Exarchou raced her steady stretch to sixth place and thirtieth overall by two hundredths of a second (0.02) behind Turkey's Dilara Buse Günaydın in 1:10.47. Three days later, in the 200 m breaststroke, Exarchou closed out the field in heat three to last and thirty-ninth overall by nearly ten seconds behind Belarus' two-time Olympian Inna Kapishina in 2:36.83. failing to advance to the semifinals.

References

External links
NBC Olympics Profile

1985 births
Living people
Greek female swimmers
Olympic swimmers of Greece
Swimmers at the 2008 Summer Olympics
Greek female breaststroke swimmers
Sportspeople from Trikala

Mediterranean Games silver medalists for Greece
Mediterranean Games bronze medalists for Greece
Swimmers at the 2005 Mediterranean Games
Swimmers at the 2009 Mediterranean Games
Mediterranean Games medalists in swimming
20th-century Greek women
21st-century Greek women